The Philadelphia Vietnam Veterans Memorial at Penn's Landing in Philadelphia, Pennsylvania was dedicated in 1987. The memorial includes the names of 648 servicemen who were killed in action or listed as missing in action during the Vietnam War from Philadelphia.

The memorial is designed as an amphitheatre plaza, with the names of each soldier etched in granite on the south wall. There are also ten panels depicting scenes of the War from the beginning to the final rescue of Vietnamese refugees in 1975.

Programs are held here to commemorate the lives lost during the War.

The Philadelphia Vietnam Veterans Memorial Fund works to preserve and enhance the memorial, and offers education programs about the War.

History
The memorial's design, created by local architect Perry M. Morgan, was chosen over 102 entries after a national competition. It initially featured the names of 630 servicemen.

In 2015, the memorial was rededicated after a seven-year restoration and redesign to make it more accessible for those with disabilities.

In 2016, the names of two additional soldiers were added to the wall.

See also
 Vietnam Veterans Memorial, Washington, DC

References

External links
 Philadelphia Vietnam Veterans Memorial Fund

Monuments and memorials in Philadelphia
Penn's Landing
Vietnam War monuments and memorials in the United States